The 4th Naval Warfare Flotilla ( or 4. sjöstridsflj) is one of three flotillas in the Swedish Navy and is a part of the Berga Naval Base. The unit is based at Berga south of the Swedish capital Stockholm. It was formed in 2005 when the former naval mine warfare flotilla was split and surface warfare units was edit.

Ships 
41st Corvett Division

42nd Minesweeper Division

43rd Supply Division

 44th Mine Clearance Division

Commanding officers
1994–1997: Christer Nordling
1997–2000: Johan Fischerström
2000–2003: Claes-Göran Hagström
2003–2006: Lennart Bengtsson
2006–2009: Jan Thörnqvist
2009–2013: Jonas Wikström
2013–2013: Pontus Krohn (acting)
2014–2017: Ewa Skoog Haslum
2017–2022: Fredrik Palmquist
2022–20xx: Anders Bäckström

Names, designations and locations

Footnotes

References

Notes

Print

External links

Naval units and formations of Sweden
Military units and formations established in 1994
1994 establishments in Sweden
Haninge Garrison